Geagea is a surname. Also spelt '"Jaajaa'" .Notable people with the surname include:

 Ibrahim Geagea (1924–1985), Lebanese alpine skier
 Nazih Geagea (born 1941), Lebanese alpine skier
 Samir Geagea (born 1952), Lebanese leader and politician
 Sethrida Geagea (born 1967), Lebanese politician